The Gilbert River is located in Far North Queensland, Australia. When combined with the Einasleigh River, the river system is the largest river system in northern Australia.

Features and location
The river flows generally northwest, joined by forty tributaries that drain the Blackbraes National Park including, from source to mouth, the Styx, Percy, Robertson, Langdon, Little, and Einasleigh rivers and numerous creeks. North of  the Gilbert discharges into the Gulf of Carpentaria. However, northwest of  an anabranch of the river forms confluence with the Smithburne River, also emptying into the Gulf. The river descends  over its  course.

The Gilbert River is a seasonal stream and discharge can vary greatly depending on the intensity of the monsoon. When combined with the Einasleigh River, the Gilbert River has the sixth-highest discharge of any river in Australia, slightly less than that of the Potomac in North America. In an intense wet season, however, the discharge can be as large as that of the Fraser River in Canada, and in a mild wet season like that of 1951-52, the discharge can be as little as one tenth of the long term mean. It is estimated that runoff from the combined Gilbert-Einasleigh River system totals about 2.2 percent of the total runoff from Australia. The record major flood of the Gilbert River was in January 1974 and the floods of February 1991 and in January and February 2009, caused widespread road closures and inundation of properties throughout the catchment.

Environment
Almost all the annual rainfall occurs between December and March: the months from May to September are rainless in over 60 percent of years (over 80 percent for August).

The river is too erratic for hydroelectricity to be viable and the soils are exceedingly infertile – generally ironstone gravels or kaolinitic clays – the combined Gilbert-Einasleigh River system is one of the relatively few completely free-flowing river systems of its size or greater in the world. In the upper reaches soils are more fertile red cracking clays but erode too easily under the erratic rainfall for cropping to be a likely prospect even with groundwater available. The mouth of the river lies in the Gulf Plains Important Bird Area.

The traditional owners of the upper catchment area are the Kunjen people.

Etymology
The river was named in July 1845 by Ludwig Leichhardt in honour of the naturalist John Gilbert who was killed two weeks earlier in an engagement with an Aboriginal group near the Gulf of Carpentaria coast.

See also

References

Gilbert River
Gulf of Carpentaria